Deshler High School can refer to:

Deshler High School (Alabama) in Tuscumbia, Alabama
Deshler High School (Nebraska) in Deshler, Nebraska